Pocé-les-Bois is a commune in the Ille-et-Vilaine department of Brittany in northwestern France.

Population
Inhabitants of Pocé-les-Bois are called in French pocéens.

See also
Communes of the Ille-et-Vilaine department

References

External links

Mayors of Ille-et-Vilaine Association 

Communes of Ille-et-Vilaine